Howard C. Forman (born January 6, 1946) was an American politician in the state of Florida.

Forman was born in Pittsburgh and came to Florida in 1955. He is a marketing consultant. He served in the Florida State Senate from 1989 to 2000 (district 32), as a member of the Democratic Party.

References

1946 births
Living people
Democratic Party Florida state senators